Joseph Frost or Joe Frost may refer to:

 Joe Frost, American musician, member of former deathcore band From the Shallows (2005–2009)
 Joe Frost, director of forthcoming film version of the 2012 novel The Panopticon
 Joe Frost (actor), British actor who plays Leo Thompkins in the TV soap Coronation Street
 Joe Frost (artist), Australian artist linked to the Watters Gallery in Sydney
 Joe Frost (film editor), British editor of  many films, including Vietnam: The Last Battle, John Pilger's 1995 documentary
 Joseph Frost (fl. mid-19th C) of the Muggletonians, a Protestant Christian movement in Britain
 Joseph Frost (boxer) (born 1960), British boxer
 Joseph A. Frost (1837–?), American politician in the Wisconsin State Assembly
 Joseph H. Frost (1805–1866), American Methodist Episcopalian missionary

See also
Jo Frost (born 1971), 'Supernanny'